Andrew J. Brookes is an English aerospace analyst, author of aviation books and aviation journalist.

He is a former Royal Air Force pilot, and flew 3,500 hours on strategic reconnaissance Victors, Canberras, and also the Vulcan bomber. He was a NATO Nuclear Release Officer and led an aviation safety team at the Ministry of Defence, before being appointed Commander of RAF Greenham Common cruise missile base. He has also served as Group Director at the RAF's Advanced Staff College, and co-ordinator of air power studies at the Joint Services Command and Staff College.

He was Chief Executive of the Air League from 2009 to 2018, having previously been Aerospace Analyst at the International Institute for Strategic Studies.

He is a Fellow of the Royal Aeronautical Society, and of the Royal United Services Institute, and was voted Defence Aerospace Journalist of the Year in 2004 and 2006.

Books
 Photo Reconnaissance (Ian Allan,)
 Force V: The history of Britain's airborne deterrent (Jane's,)
 Fighter Squadron at War (Ian Allan,)
 Bomber Squadron at War (Ian Allan, April 1983)
 Avro Vulcan (Ian Allan,)
 Handley Page Victor (Ian Allan,)
 Crash! Military Aircraft Disasters, Accidents and Incidents (Ian Allan,)
 Disaster in the Air (Ian Allan,)
 Flights to Disaster (Ian Allan,)
 Air War over Italy (Ian Allan,)
 Destination Disaster (Ian Allan,)
 Air War over Russia (Ian Allan,)
 Vulcan Units of the Cold War (Osprey Publishing,)

References

External links
List of books and magazine articles by Andrew Brookes (Archive)

Aviation writers
British military writers
Living people
English aviators
English male journalists
Year of birth missing (living people)